Events in the year 1874 in Portugal.

Incumbents
 Monarch: Louis I
 Prime Minister: Fontes Pereira de Melo

Events
 12 July – Legislative election

Arts and entertainment

Sports

Births

 3 May – António Ginestal Machado, politician (died 1940)
 4 July – Félix Bermudes, Olympic shooter (1924) and author (died 1960).
29 November – António Egas Moniz, neurologist, winner of the Nobel Prize for Physiology or Medicine (1949) (died 1955).

Deaths

References

 
1870s in Portugal
Years of the 19th century in Portugal
Portugal